Leszek F. Demkowicz is an American engineer and scientist, and currently the W. A. "Tex" Moncrief Chair in Computational Engineering & Sciences II at University of Texas at Austin.

References

Year of birth missing (living people)
Living people
University of Texas at Austin faculty
21st-century American engineers